Sapperton is a village in the South Kesteven district of Lincolnshire, England. The nearest town is Grantham,  to the west. Adjacent villages include Braceby, Pickworth  and Ropsley.

Sapperton was a civil parish until 1931 when it was abolished to form Braceby and Sapperton.

It was excavated between 1973 and 1981, and again 1984 to 1988, revealing stone
buildings, iron-smelting furnaces and various artifacts. 

The Hall is a Grade II listed building and dates possibly from the 16th century, with 17th- and 18th-century alterations, and very minor 19th- and 20th-century alterations.

St Nicholas parish church is Grade II listed and dedicated to Saint Nicholas. It dates from the 12th to the 15th century with 19th-century alterations. The tower is 13th-century and there is a 12th-century font.

The ecclesiastical parish is part of The North Beltisloe Group of parishes, in the Deanery of Beltisloe in the Diocese of Lincoln. From 2006 to 2011 the incumbent was The Revd Richard Ireson.

References

External links

Villages in Lincolnshire
South Kesteven District
Former civil parishes in Lincolnshire